Anthony Vince (30 July 1902 – 28 September 1986) was a Canadian sprinter. He competed in the men's 100 metres and the 4x100 metres relay events at the 1924 Summer Olympics.

References

External links
 

1902 births
1986 deaths
Athletes (track and field) at the 1924 Summer Olympics
Canadian male sprinters
Olympic track and field athletes of Canada
Athletes from Toronto